Marcel Audiffren was a French priest, physicist, and inventor who promoted the residential refrigerator. He served as abbot of his Cistercian monastery, and originally designed a hand-cranked device for cooling liquid, such as wine, for his monks.

European-manufactured refrigerators based on his designs were first sold in the U.S. in 1903. He received U.S. Patents #551,107 (in 1895) and #898,400 (in 1908, with Albert Sigrun). These patents were purchased by C. A. Griscom for his American Audiffren Refrigerating Machine Company. Machines based on Audiffren's sulfur dioxide process were manufactured by General Electric in Fort Wayne, Indiana and marketed by the Johns-Manville company. The first unit was sold in 1911. Audiffren machines were expensive, selling for about $1,000—about twice as much as an automobile cost at the time.

References

Year of birth missing
Year of death missing
19th-century French inventors
French Cistercians
French abbots
French physicists
Cistercian abbots